is a passenger railway station located in the city of Matsuyama, Ehime Prefecture, Japan. It is operated by JR Shikoku and has the station number "Y52".

Lines
Connections with other local or limited express trains are needed to travel further east or west along the line.

Layout
The station, which is unstaffed, consists of two opposed side platforms serving two tracks. Access to the opposite platform is by means of a footbridge. A siding branches off line 1 and leads to the traces of a disused freight platform.

Adjacent stations

History
At that time the station was operated by Japanese Government Railways, later becoming Japanese National Railways (JNR). With the privatization of JNR on 1 April 1987, control of the station passed to JR Shikoku.

Surrounding area
Horie Sea Station Umiterasu (former Horie Port)
Horie Beach
Matsuyama Municipal Horie Elementary School

See also
 List of railway stations in Japan

References

External links
Station timetable

Railway stations in Ehime Prefecture
Railway stations in Japan opened in 1927
Railway stations in Matsuyama, Ehime